The Wari-Bateshwar (Bengali: উয়ারী-বটেশ্বর,Uari-Bôṭeshshor) ruins in Narsingdi, Dhaka Division, Bangladesh is one of the oldest urban archaeological sites in Bangladesh. Excavation in the site unearthed a fortified urban center, paved roads and suburban dwelling. The site was primarily occupied during the iron age, from 400 to 100 BCE, as evidenced by the abundance of punch-marked coins and Northern Black Polished Ware (NBPW) artifacts. 

The site also reveals signs of pit dwelling, a feature typically found in chalcolithic archaeological sites in the Indian sub-continent.

Geography
The site sprawls across Wari and Bateshwar, two adjacent villages in the Belabo Upazila of Narsingdi district, about 17 km North-west of the confluence of the rivers Old Brahmaputra and Meghna at the lower end of Sylhet basin. Borehole records show that the site lies on the remnants of a Pleistocene fluvial terrace about 15 metre above sea level and 6-8 metre above the current river level. The sediment consists of brownish red clay with interbedded sand layers, locally knows as Madhupur clay. 

The main stem of the Brahmaputra river shifted back and forth between the Brahmaputra-Jamuna and the Old Brahmaputra branches through history. Around 2500 BCE, avulsion of the main channel to the Brahmaputra-Jamuna branch gave rise to discontinuous peatlands throughout Sylhet basin. The evidence of early urban settlement on the peatlands at Wari-Bateshwar was found in stratigraphic layers dated ~1100 BCE. Human occupation continued for nearly a millennium until ~200 BCE, when the channel shifted back to the Old Brahmaputra branch. The resultant flooding possibly led to the abandonment of the Wari-Bateshwar urban center around 100 BCE. Eventually the 1762 Arakan earthquake again caused the main channel to shift to the Brahmaputra-Jamuna branch.

Discovery
Locals from Wari-Bateshwar have long been aware of the availability of archeological artifacts, especially silver punch-marked coins and semi-precious gemstone beads in the area. In the 1930s, Hanif Pathan, a local school teacher, started collecting these artifacts, and later inspired his son Habibulla Pathan to continue the exploration. The father-son duo created a local museum called Bateshwar Sangrahashala to store and exhibit their collection. Habibulla Pathan published a number of newspaper articles and books describing the artifacts. Nevertheless, the site took a while to attract the attention of academics and archaeologists in Bangladesh.

Excavation
In 2000, a team led by Sufi Mostafizur Rahman, an archeologist from Jahangir Nagar University, started excavation in the site. The excavation revealed a 600m x 600m fortified enclosure or citadel surrounded by a 30m wide moat, with an additional 5.8 km long, 5m wide and 2-5 m high mud rampart-- locally known as Asom Rajar Gorh-- to its west and south west. A series of excavation events took place over the next two decades that marked 48 archeological sites in the vicinity of the citadel. These suburban structures feature brick-built dwelling units, and a 160 m section of a street paved with lime-mortar and potshards. 

In 2004, a 2.60 m x 2.20 m x 0.52 pit-dwelling complex was unearthed to the east of the urban center. The complex houses a pit, a hearth, a granary with a circumference of 272 cm and depth of 74 cm, and a stepped water-wall. The complex has a red mud-floor anointed with grey-colored clay, but the floor of the granary is made with lime-surki. This matches the chalcolithic pit-dwelling site at Inamgaon in Southern India, dated 1500–1000 BC, which also features a lime-surki floor.

Artifacts found in Wari-Bateshwar include semi-precious stone beads, glass beads, a large number of punch-marked coins, iron axe and knives, copper bangles, a copper dagger, high-tin Bronze and ceramic knobbed ware, Black and red ware, Northern Black Polished Ware and Black Slipped Ware.

History
No inscription or written record was found in this site. Although stratigraphic evidence points to earlier urban settlement, radiometric dating of the artifacts places the peak active period of the Wari-Bateshwar urban center in the mid-1st millennium BC. The discovery of rouletted and knobbed ware, and stone beads of eclectic nature implies southeast Asiatic and Roman contacts through river routes. It is postulated by Sufi Mostafizur Rahman, the leader of the first excavation team, that Wari-Bateshwar is the ancient emporium or trading post "Sounagora" mentioned by Ptolemy in Geographia. 

Two types of punch-marked coins were found in the site-- Pre-Mauryan Janapada series regional coins (600-400 BCE) and Mauryan imperial series coins (500-200 BCE). The regional coins bear a set of four symbols on one side and either a blank or a minute symbol on the reverse side. Symbols include boat, lobster, fish in hook or scorpion, cross leaf etc. that are uncommon in contemporary coins found in the other regions of India. It is postulated that these coins were used as local currency in the Vanga Kingdom and are distinct from the coins used in Anga, found in Chandraketugarh in West Bengal, India.  

Wari-Bateshwar yielded a very large variety of semi-precious stone bids, which is unprecedented in Indian archaeology of the period. Bead materials include various kinds of quartz-- Rock Crystal, Citrine, Amethyst, Agate, Carnelian, Chalcedony, and green or red Jasper. Stratigraphic analysis shows that the layers containing signs of the vibrant bead culture were abruptly interrupted by sedimentary layers dating around 200 BCE, which implies possible displacement of the Wari-Bateshwar people (and loss of bead culture) by a course change of the Old Brahmaputra River.

Culture
Despite the lack of inscription or written records, symbols on the discovered artifacts shed light on the cultural elements of the Wari-Bateshwar society. The punch-marked coins bear the solar and six-armed symbols, mountain with three arches surmounted by a crescent, Nandipada or taurine symbol and various animal motifs and geometric figures. On the other hand, Nandipada and Svastika symbols are found on stone querns. These symbols indicate the prevalence of Hinduism in the Wari-Bateshwar society. 

Archaeobotanical study of carbonized seed and seed fragments reveals the predominance of rice agriculture. The subspecies cultivated was japonica rather than Indica, the more dominant cultivar in contemporary South India. Other crops included barley, oat, a small numbers of summer millets, a wide variety of summer and winter pulses, cotton, sesame and mustard. The abundance of cotton seed fragments indicate an important role of textile production in the Wari-Bateshwar economy.

Gallery

See also

 Timeline of Bangladeshi history
 List of archaeological sites in Bangladesh
 Gangaridai
 Chandraketugarh

References

External links

 Wari-Bateshwar in Banglapedia

Narsingdi District
Buildings and structures completed in the 4th century BC
Archaeological sites in Bangladesh
Former populated places in Bangladesh
Indo-Aryan archaeological sites